John Francis Gerry (November 17, 1925 – March 10, 1995) was a United States district judge of the United States District Court for the District of New Jersey.

Education and career

Born in Camden, New Jersey, Gerry received an Artium Baccalaureus degree, magna cum laude, from Princeton University in 1950. He received a Bachelor of Laws, magna cum laude, from Harvard Law School in 1953. He was in the United States Army Air Corps from 1944 to 1946. He was in private practice of law with the firm of Wallace, Douglass & Gerry in Camden from 1953 to 1972. He was a judge of the Camden County Court from 1972 to 1973. He was a judge to the Superior Court of New Jersey from 1973 to 1975.

Federal judicial service

Gerry was nominated by President Gerald Ford on November 18, 1974, to a seat on the United States District Court for the District of New Jersey vacated by Judge James Aloysius Coolahan. He was confirmed by the United States Senate on December 18, 1974, and received his commission on December 20, 1974. He served as Chief Judge from 1987 to 1994. He was a member of the Judicial Conference of the United States from 1990 to 1994 and Chairman of the Executive Committee of the conference from 1992 to 1994. He assumed senior status on October 1, 1994. His service was terminated on March 10, 1995, due to his death of liver cancer in his home in Moorestown Township, New Jersey.

References

Further reading
 
 John F. Gerry The Political Graveyard, a database of historic cemeteries

1925 births
1995 deaths
People from Mount Holly, New Jersey
United States Army Air Forces personnel of World War II
Princeton University alumni
Harvard Law School alumni
Judges of the United States District Court for the District of New Jersey
United States district court judges appointed by Gerald Ford
20th-century American judges
Deaths from liver cancer
People from Moorestown, New Jersey
20th-century American lawyers
Superior court judges in the United States
Deaths from cancer in New Jersey